Regional Agricultural Research Station, Pattambi (RARS Pattambi) is a research Station under the Central Zone of Kerala Agricultural University at Pattambi in Palakkad district of Kerala, India.

This research station was established in 1927. Later in 1930 it was renamed as Agricultural Research Station  and later in 1962 it was renamed as Central Rice Research Station. Kerala Agricultural University took over this Station in 1971. The station was upgraded to the status of RARS in 1981 and made the headquarters of the Central Zone of Kerala Agricultural University.

At a meeting held at the station premises in 2013, The Zonal Research Extension Advisory Committee (ZREAC) of the Central Zone of KAU recommended adoption of several new varieties of crops and promotion of integrated packages for management of pests, diseases and weeds.

Around 54 high yielding rice varieties were developed at this station.

Varieties of rice developed by RARS Pattambi

Major Programmes of the Station
85 ongoing research projects/experiments are there in the station. The major programmes are :-
	
	All India Co-ordinated Rice Improvement Project (AICRIP) 
	All India Co-ordinated Research Project on Arid Legumes (AICRP on AL)
	AICRP on Long Term Fertilizer Experiments (AICRP on LTFE)
	University Research Projects (Non Plan, NARP Non Plan & Plan)
	ICAR Adhoc Scheme on Development of superior hybrid rice varieties.
	ICAR funded project on Technology Assessment and Refinement through Institution Village Linkage programme (TAR IVLP)
	National Seed Production – Breeder Seed production Programme (NSP – BSP)
	Research Components of National Watershed Development Programme for Rainfed area (NWDPRA)
	Intensive Vegetable Production (IVP) Programme

Current Activities
	Rice Research
	
	Conservation and characterisation of germplasm
	Breeding for yield improvement and consumer acceptability
	Resistance breeding
	Development of hybrid rice
Research on yield maximisation under different situations
Nutrient management & weed control studies
	Research on summer rice fallow utilisation
	Long Term fertilizer Experiments
	Screening of cultures for pest and disease resistance
	Evaluation of new insecticides and fungicides
Research on sex pheromone for pest management
	Studies on botanicals for control of disease and pests

Research on Pulses:
	
	Conservation of germplasm of major pulse crops
	Developing short duration drought tolerant cowpea varieties
	Evolving photo insensitive horsegram varieties for rice fallows
	Developing red gram varieties for homesteads
	
Research on Vegetables
	
	Mosaic resistance breeding in Chilli
	Identification of Chinese potato types for the region
	Developing mosaic tolerant ashgourd
	Research on bio-fertilisers in vegetables

Major Units

	Farm Unit
	Agromet Unit
	Information and Sales Counter
	Research Workshop
	Rice Museum
	Dairy Unit
	State Seed Testing Laboratory
	Regional Horticultural Nursery
	Regional Instrumentation Laboratory
	Computer Centre & ARIS Cell
	Station Library

Disciplines & Divisions

Crop Improvement

	Division of Plant Breeding & Genetics
	Division of Pulses
	Division of Horticulture

Crop Management

	Division of agronomy
	Division of Soil Science
	Division of Agricultural Engineering

Plant Protection

	Division of Entomology
	Division of Plant Pathology

Social Sciences

	Division of Agricultural Extension
	Division of Agricultural Statistics
	Division of Agricultural Economics

Land Resources

	Low lands : 19.64 Ha
	Palliyals : 11.99 Ha
	Garden lands : 13.34 Ha
	Total Area : 44.97 Ha

References

External links
 Official Website 

Agricultural universities and colleges in Kerala
Agricultural research stations in Kerala
Universities and colleges in Palakkad district
1927 establishments in India
Phytopathology